Machara Castle is a castle in the village of Machara, Gulripshi municipality, Autonomous Republic of Abkhazia, Georgia. The castle was built in the Middle Ages. The castle walls are in a poor  physical condition and need an urgent conservation.

See also 
 Machara

References 

Castles and forts in Georgia (country)
Fortifications in Abkhazia